Vitaliy Nikolayevich Bubentsov (Russian: Виталий Бубенцов; born February 12, 1944, Murmansk) is a Russian artist working in the genres of portrait, landscape, still-life and thematic picture executed in various techniques. He is an honored artist of the Russian Federation, a member of the Artists’ Union of Russia, a member of the International Association of Visual Art AIAP, UNESCO.

Biography 
He was born in 1944 in Murmansk city.
Since 1969 he has been regularly participating in All-Union, republican, district and regional art exhibitions. He is a participant of foreign exhibitions in Finland, Norway, Sweden, the United States, Denmark, the Netherlands.
He lives and works in Murmansk.

Education 
Has left Leningrad Art School named after V. A. Serov in 1963 and Leningrad Institute of Painting, Sculpture and Architecture named after I. E. Repin in 1972.

Solo exhibitions 
 1978 — Solo exhibition (Murmansk, Russia), solo exhibition (Rovaniemi, Finland)
 1986 — Solo exhibition (Lulea, Sweden)
 1990 — Solo exhibition (Murmansk, Russia)
 1991 — Solo exhibition (Ide Gallery, the Netherlands)
 1993 — Solo exhibition (Rovaniemi, Finland)
 1994 — Solo exhibition (the Netherlands)
 1996 — Solo exhibition (Murmansk, Russia), solo exhibition (Pskov, Russia)
 1997 — Solo exhibition (Murmansk, Russia)
 1998 — Solo exhibition (Murmansk, Russia)
 2001 — Solo exhibition (Murmansk, Russia)
 2004 — Solo exhibition (the International Artists Studio in Vadsyo, Norway), solo anniversary exhibition (Murmansk, Russia)
 2005 — Solo exhibition (Murmansk, Russia)
 2008 — Solo exhibition «Vitaliy Bubentsov in Groningen» (Museum on Shipping History in Groningen, the Netherlands)

Group exhibitions 
 1972 — Republican exhibition «Around the Native Country» (Moscow, Russia)
 1974 — The 4th zonal exhibition «The Soviet North» (Vologda, Russia)
 1977 — «The Youth of Russia» (Moscow, Russia), «The Artists of Russia to Fishermen» (Astrakhan - Kaliningrad – Murmansk – Moscow), All-Union exhibition «The Youth of the Country » (Moscow, Russia), All-Union exhibition of monumental art (Kazan, Russia), group ex hibition of works of participants of All-Union creative team of marine painters (Arkhangelsk, Russia)
 1978 — All-Union exhibition «The Native Country » (Minsk, Belarus), All-Union water color exhibition (Moscow, Russia)
 1979 — The 5th zonal exhibition «The Soviet North» (Syktyvkar, Russia), All-Union exhibition «Blue Roads of the Motherland» (Moscow, Russia)
 1980 — Republican exhibition «The Nature and We» (Moscow – Leningrad - Murmansk)
 1981 — «Around the Native Country» (Moscow, Russia), the 7th All-Union water color exhibition (Moscow, Russia)
 1983 — The 3rd All-Russian exhibition «Drawing and Water Color» (Leningrad, Russia), «Blue Scopes of Russia» (Moscow, Russia)
 1984 — All-Union water color exhibition (Moscow, Russia), the 6th zonal exhibition «The Soviet North» (Novgorod, Russia)
 1985 — «The World was Disputed –We will Save it» (Moscow, Russia), All-Russian exhibition of artists-water-colorists (Moscow, Russia), international exhibition of works of artists of a symposium «Experimental Painting 85» (Lulea, Sweden), foreign exhibition of works of Murmansk artists (Boden, Sweden), «The Kola Earth» (Arkhangelsk, Russia)
 1986 — «Graphics of the Arctic Circle» (Riga, Latvia), «Artists of Murman» (Petrozavodsk, Karelia)
 1987 — The 8th All-Union water color exhibition (Leningrad, Russia), All-Union exhibition «The Artist and the time» (Moscow, Russia)
 1989 — District exhibition «Artists of the North» (Murmansk, Russia), exhibition of works of Murmansk artists (Vadsyo, Norway)
 1991 — Foreign exhibition of works of Murmansk artists (Rovaniemi, Finland)
 1992 — Foreign exhibition of works of Murmansk artists (Galleries "Dowton" and "Kent" in Jacksonville, the USA)
 1993 — Foreign exhibition of works of Murmansk artists (Denmark)
 1997 — District exhibition «The Russian North» (Kirov, Russia), solo exhibition (Murmansk, Russia)
 1998 — The 9th Russian exhibition "Russia" (Moscow, Russia), foreign exhibition of works of Murmansk artists (Groningen, the Netherlands)
 1999 — «A Green noise» (Ples, Russia), «To your Name …» (Moscow, Russia)
 2000 — «The Image of the Native Country» (Kirov, Russia)
 2003 — The 9th district exhibition «The Russian North»
 2004 — Russian exhibition «Russia Х» (Moscow, Russia), the 1st international exhibition of water color "Aquabiennale" (Petrozavodsk, Karelia), «School. Teacher. Art» (Cheboksary, Chuvashiya)
 2005 — International exhibition devoted to the 60th anniversary of the victory (Moscow, Russia), «Artists of Murman» (Vologda, Russia), exhibition of artists of the North-West of Russia "Sports" (Murmansk, Russia)
 2006 — Academic travelling exhibition «The North-West of Russia» (Murmansk-Petrozavodsk-St. Petersburg-Novgorod)
 2007 — «Around the Native Country» (Vologda, Russia), international exhibition "Ljust" (Gallery Bjutenljust, the Netherlands), exhibition of participants of the international plein air «Quiet dawns over Sergilahta» (Karelia)
 2008 — All-Russian art exhibition "Fatherland" devoted to the 50th  anniversary of the Artists’ Union of Russia; group exhibition at the international festival in commemoration of Barents (Vardyo, Norway), exhibition of participants of the Russian plein air – 2008 within the limits of the international exhibition "Aquabiennale" (Kizhi, Karelia)
 2009 — "Russia" the 11th Russian art exhibition (Moscow, Russia)
 2010 — International art exhibition "65 Years of the Victory» (Moscow, Russia)

Ranks and awards 
 an honored artist of the Russian Federation,
 a member of the Artists’ Union of Russia,
 a member of the International Association of Visual Art AIAP, UNESCO.
He is awarded with a silver medal of the Academy of Arts of Russia, a recipient of Murmansk Komsomol Prize, twice of the Regional Administration Prize, an award winner of the Artists’ Union of Russia.

The works of the artist are kept in collections of 
 Murmansk Regional Art Museum;
 Murmansk Regional Local History Museum;
 Management Office of Exhibitions of Art Fund of the RSFSR;
 Management Office of Exhibitions of the Ministry of Culture of Russia;
 Central Museum of Old Russian Culture and Art n. a. A. Rublyov;
 Belarus State Art Museum of Minsk city;
 State Art Museum of Latvia, Riga city;
 Pskov State Historical, Architectural and Art Memorial Estate;
 Vologda Regional Art Gallery;
 Town Showroom of Petrozavodsk city, Karelia;
 Ples State Historical, Architectural and Art Memorial Estate;
 Gallery of the Society Fnik of Lulea city, Sweden;
 Local History Museum of Sebezh city, Pskov region;
 Local History Museum of Pustoshka city, Pskov region;
 In national art galleries: Podtesovo vil., Krasnodar Krai, Rodnino vil., Altay Krai, Privolnaya village, Krasnodar Krai;
 In internet gallery Art from Russia;
 In galleries and private collections of Russia in the cities: Moscow, St. Petersburg, Murmansk, Arkhangelsk, Vologda, Pskov, etc.;
 In galleries and private collections abroad: Norway, Sweden, Denmark, Finland, the Netherlands, France, Germany, Bulgaria, the USA, etc.

Information and publications on creative work 
 Since 1990 numerous publications on oeuvre of Bubentsov in newspaper "Murmanskiy Vestnik"
 2001 — Artists of Northern, Siberian and Far Eastern districts of Russia. Book one
 2002 — The Best People of Russia: encyclopedia
 2003 — «The Artist of Russia» №19-20
 2004 — Newspaper "Finnmarken" (Norway)
 2005 — Anniversary album of the Artists’ Union
 2005 — Magazine «Triumphal Arch» №1
 2005 — Newspaper Østhavet (Norway)
 2007 — Magazine Russian Gallery – XXI century. №5
 2007 — Album «Prize Winners and Diploma Winners of Academic Exhibitions in Federal Districts of Russia - 250 years of the Russian Academy of Arts»
 2008 — Biographical article «Kola Encyclopedia»
 2008 — Booklet of participants of the plein air of artists-water-colorists in Kizhi (Karelia)
 2008 — Newspaper «Woensdag» of April 9, 2008 (the Netherlands)
 2008 — Newspaper «Dinsdag» of April 8, 2008 (the Netherlands)

Other activity 
 In 2004 he worked in the International Artists Studio in Vadsyo (Norway)
 Now he is teaching in Murmansk State Pedagogical University. He is an assistant professor of the fine arts department.

External links 
 
 Encyclopedia
 Аrt.murmanout
 Art from Russia
 Official website of Murmansk State Pedagogical University

1944 births
Russian artists
Living people
People from Murmansk